The 1951 World Snooker Championship was a professional snooker tournament. The final was held at the Tower Circus in Blackpool, England.

For the fifth consecutive year, the final was contested by Fred Davis and Walter Donaldson. Davis won his third World title by defeating Donaldson 58–39 in the final. Donaldson made the highest break of the tournament with 106 in frame 32 of his semi-final match against Horace Lindrum.

After defeating the then 42-year-old Sidney Smith — runner-up in the 1938 and 1939 championships — in the quarter-finals, the 15-year younger John Pulman reached the semi-finals, where he played against the eventual winner Fred Davis, before he retired and gave Davis an early bye into the final.

Schedule

Main draw
Sources:

Qualifying
John Barrie met Sydney Lee at Burroughes Hall in London from 6 to 8 November. Barrie led 7–5 after the first day  and 15–9 after two days. He made a break of 101 on the second evening. He eventually won 23–12. Barrie then met Dickie Laws on the following three days also at Burroughes Hall. Barrie took an 8–4 lead, increased to a winning 18–6 lead after two days. The final score was 27–8.

References

1951
World Snooker Championship
World Snooker Championship
World Snooker Championship